Gryphoca is an extinct genus of earless seals from Neogene marine deposits in the North Sea basin.

Fossils
There are two recognized species of Gryphoca, G. similis and G. nordica. G. similis is known from Pliocene marine deposits in the Antwerp region of Belgium, while fossils of P. nordica have been found in the Tortonian-age Gram Formation in Denmark.

References

Miocene pinnipeds
Pliocene pinnipeds
Phocines
Prehistoric carnivoran genera
Prehistoric pinnipeds of Europe
Fossil taxa described in 1877